(originally , "butter and bread") smørbrød "butter bread" (Norwegian), is a traditional open-faced sandwich in the cuisines of Denmark, Norway and Sweden that usually consists of a piece of buttered rye bread (a dense, dark brown bread), topped with commercial or homemade cold cuts, pieces of meat or fish, cheese or spreads, and garnishes.

Bread
Bread is a very important part of the Scandinavian diet, primarily , which is sourdough rye bread. It is a dark, heavy bread which is often bought sliced, in varieties from light-coloured rye to very dark, and from refined to whole-grain. The bread is usually buttered, though for some variants, a spread of lard is customary.

Toppings

Traditional toppings include pickled herrings (plain, spiced or curried), slightly sweeter than Dutch or German herrings; thinly sliced cheese in many varieties; sliced cucumber, tomato and boiled eggs; pork liver-paste; dozens of types of cured or processed meat in thin slices, or smoked fish such as salmon; mackerel in tomato sauce; pickled cucumber; boiled egg, and rings of red onion. Mayonnaise mixed with peas, sliced boiled asparagus and diced carrot, called  ('Italian salad'), remoulade or other thick sauces often top the layered open sandwich, which is usually eaten with utensils. It is custom to pass the dish of sliced bread around the table, and then to pass around each dish of toppings, and people help themselves.

More festive meals can be loosely divided into courses: fish toppings first (such as herring, shrimp, or smoked salmon) followed by cold cuts and salads, and finally cheese with bread or crackers and fruit. 'apple pork', roast pork or bacon in apple sauce). Summer offers lighter fare such as smoked mackerel,  (lit. 'summer salad', radish and cucumber in a smoked cheese dressing), new potatoes, and freshly peeled shrimp.

  (Danish: 'veterinarian's midnight snack') – on a piece of dark rye bread, a layer of liver pâté, topped with a slice of salt beef and a slice of meat aspic. This is all garnished with raw onion rings and garden cress.
 Eel – smoked eel on dark rye bread, topped with scrambled eggs and sliced radishes or chopped chives.
  – warm rough-chopped liver pâté served on dark rye bread, topped with bacon, and sautéed mushrooms.
 Roast beef – thinly sliced and served on dark rye bread, topped with a portion of remoulade, and decorated with a sprinkling of shredded horseradish and toasted onion.
Eggs and prawns –  Thin slices of egg and prawns on either rye bread or white bread topped with tomato, mayonnaise, and lemon, and garnished with garden cress.
 Roast pork – thinly sliced and served on dark rye bread, topped with red sweet and sour cabbage and thinly-sliced pickles and garnished with a slice of orange.
 Spiced meat roll – thin-sliced cold cut, garnished with a thick slice of sky, raw onion rings and garden cress.
Stjerneskud (lit. "shooting star") – on a base of buttered white bread, two pieces of fish: a piece of steamed white fish on one half, a piece of fried, battered plaice on the other half. On top is piled a mound of shrimp, which is then garnished with a dollop of mayonnaise, red caviar, and a lemon slice.
 Tartar – raw lean beef mince with salt and pepper, served on dark rye bread, topped with raw onion rings, grated horseradish and a raw egg yolk.

In literature 

The Dano-Norwegian poet Johan Herman Wessel (1742–1785) wrote a classic poem about smørrebrød:

See also
 Smörgåsbord
 Tapas

References

Literature
 Katrine Klinken, Smørrebrød – Danish open, Thaning & Appel, 2008.
 Ida Davidsen and Mia Davidsen, Open your heart to the Danish open – : the Davidsen dynasty and their best recipes, Lindhardt og Ringhof, 2006. .
 Inge Lotz, Danish open sandwiches, Aschehoug Fakta, 1997. .
 Troelsø, Ole (2012), Smørrebrød i Danmark - Stederne, stykkerne og historien, København: Forlaget Lucullus, .
 Dine with the Danes Video of Danish open-face sandwiches

Danish cuisine
Norwegian cuisine
Swedish cuisine
Scandinavian cuisine
Danish culture
Foods featuring butter
Cheese sandwiches
Rye breads
National dishes
Open-faced sandwiches